The 1933 NFL season was the 14th regular season of the National Football League. 

Because of the success of the Playoff Game the year before, the league divided its teams into two divisions for the first time, with the winners of each division playing in a Championship Game to determine the NFL Champion. 

Three new teams joined the league: the Pittsburgh Pirates, the Philadelphia Eagles, and the Cincinnati Reds, while the Boston Braves changed their name to the Boston Redskins and the Staten Island Stapletons, while still scheduling games against league teams, left the league.

The season ended when the Chicago Bears defeated the New York Giants in the first ever NFL Championship Game.

Major rule changes
Due to the success of the 1932 NFL Playoff Game, the league stopped using the exact rules of college football and started to develop its own revisions:
The forward pass is legal anywhere behind the line of scrimmage. Previously, the passer had to be at least five yards back from the scrimmage line. This change is referred to as the "Bronko Nagurski Rule" after his controversial touchdown in the 1932 NFL Playoff Game.
Hashmarks or inbounds lines are added to the field 10 yards in from each sideline. All plays would start with the ball on or between the hashmarks.
It is a touchback when a punt hits the opponent's goal posts before being touched by a player of either team.
It is a safety if a ball that is kicked behind the goal line hits the goal posts, and rolls back out of the end zone or is recovered by the kicking team.

Final standings

NFL Championship Game

League leaders

Coaching changes
Boston Redskins: Lud Wray was replaced by William Dietz.
Brooklyn Dodgers: Benny Friedman was replaced by Cap McEwen.
Chicago Bears: To save money, franchise owner George Halas laid off Ralph Jones and took over the head coaching duties.
Cincinnati Reds: For the Reds' first season in the league, Al Jolley served three games and Mike Palm served seven.
Chicago Cardinals: Jack Chevigny was replaced by Paul J. Schissler.
Pittsburgh Pirates: Forrest Douds became the first head coach of the new team.
Philadelphia Eagles: Lud Wray became the first head coach of the new team.

Stadium changes
 The renamed Boston Redskins moved from Braves Field to Fenway Park.
 The Cincinnati Reds began play at Crosley Field.
 The Pittsburgh Pirates began play at Forbes Field
 The Philadelphia Eagles began play at the Baker Bowl.

This was also the first season of selected Green Bay Packers home games in Milwaukee, with the Packers hosting one game in 1933 at Borchert Field. The team would then regularly play two or three home games each year in Milwaukee from 1934 to 1994.

References
 NFL Record and Fact Book
 NFL History 1931–1940  (Last accessed December 4, 2005)
 Total Football: The Official Encyclopedia of the National Football League

National Football League seasons
National Football League